Little Long Pond may refer to:

 Little Long Pond (Plymouth, Massachusetts)
 Little Long Pond (Wareham, Massachusetts)